Wacław "Wacek" Kisielewski (12 February 1943 – 12 July 1986) was a Polish pianist. He was the son of Polish politician Stefan Kisielewski, and one half of the pianist duo Marek i Wacek (Marek and Wacek) with Marek Tomaszewski. He made arrangements of classical and modern music, and played concerts in many countries worldwide.

Waclaw died in a car accident in Wyszków and was buried in the Powązki Cemetery in Warsaw on 17 July 1986. The funeral mass in the Church of Saint Cross Piaseczno was attended by a huge crowd. The representatives of EMI and Yamaha were present, among others.

Discography

With Marek and Wacek

Long plays
 1966 – Ballade pour deux pianos Barclay
 1968
 Kisielewski-Tomaszewski: Play Favourite Melodies (Pronit; CD re-release by Muza in 1994)
 Marek & Vacek: Piano Firework (Polydor)
 Marek & Vacek: Romanische Figel (Polydor)
 Marek & Vacek: Trumerei (Polydor)
 1969
 Marek & Vacek: Piano Fascination (Polydor)
 Marek & Vacek: Piano Firework, Vol. 1-2 (Polydor)
 1970 – Marek & Vacek: Classical and Pop Pianos (Polydor)
 1971 – Marek & Vacek: Stargala, Vol. 1-2 (Polydor)
 1972 – Marek & Vacek: Concert Hits (Electrola)
 1973
 Marek & Vacek: Concert Hits II (Electrola)
 Marek & Vacek: Concert Hits, Vol. 1-2 (Electrola)
 1974 – Marek und Vacek Live: Vol. 1-2 (Electrola)
 1976 – Marek und Vacek: Spectrum (Electrola)
 1977 – Marek & Vacek: Wiener Walzer (Electrola)
 1978 – Marek und Vacek: Das Programm (Polydor)
 1979
 Marek und Vacek, Vol. 1-2 (Polydor)
 Marek & Vacek Live (Wifon)
 1980 – Marek & Vacek: Mondscheinsonate (Polydor)
 1981
 Marek i wacek grają utwory romantyczne (Veriton)
 Marek und Vacek in Gold (Polydor)
 1982 – Die Marek und Vacek Story 1962-1982, Vol. 1-2 (Prisma)
 1984
 Marek und Vacek '84 (Intercord)
 Marek i Vacek (Wifon)
 Marek und Vacek: Welterfolge (Intercord)
 Marek and Vacek: Again (Pronit)
 1987 – Marek & Vacek: The Last Concert, Vol. 1-2 (Pronit)

Compact discs
 1994 – Kisielewski - Tomaszewski: Play Favourite Melodies (Muza)
 2001 – Niepokonani: Marek & Vacek Live (Polskie Radio/Universal Music Polska)
 2002 – Prząśniczka (Pomaton/EMI)

Filmography

Film

Television

References

External links
 

1943 births
1986 deaths
Musicians from Warsaw
Polish classical pianists
Male classical pianists
Polish jazz pianists
Burials at Powązki Cemetery
Road incident deaths in Poland
20th-century classical pianists
20th-century male musicians